Hanfield is an unincorporated community in Washington Township, Grant County, Indiana.

History
A post office was established at Hanfield in 1881, and remained in operation until it was discontinued in 1929. Hanfield is likely a conjoin of the surnames Hancock and Garfield.

Geography

References

Unincorporated communities in Grant County, Indiana
Unincorporated communities in Indiana